Gun laws in Arkansas regulate the sale, possession, and use of firearms and ammunition in the state of Arkansas in the United States.

Summary table

Arkansas gun laws
Automatic weapons must be registered with the Arkansas secretary of state, in addition to being registered under federal law.

Some counties have adopted Second Amendment sanctuary resolutions and a statewide law was adopted on April 29, 2021.

Open and concealed carry
As of August 16, 2013 permits are no longer required to concealed carry a handgun. However, there was some confusion over the legality of permitless carry in Arkansas. For concealed carry, Arkansas still offers CCW permits on a "shall issue" basis. Open carry of handguns is legal by a simple reading of the law, yet some Arkansas state officials denied that it was legal. Applicants must pass a background check and complete a training course to receive a new or renewal concealed carry license. An existing license is suspended or revoked if the license holder is arrested for a felony or for any violent act, becomes ineligible due to mental health treatment, or for a number of other reasons. Concealed firearms may not be carried in a courthouse, meeting place of any government entity, athletic event, places of higher education, or in a number of other places.

On October 17, 2018, the Arkansas Court of Appeals issued a ruling that clarified that the mere carrying of a handgun is not a crime by itself absent a purpose to attempt to unlawfully employ the handgun as a weapon against a person, and any ambiguity would be found in favor of the defendant per the rule of lenity. This effectively ends the dispute on the legality of permitless carry in Arkansas, allowing for both open and concealed carry without a permit in Arkansas.

Act 746
Amended portion of AR statute 5-73-120 (description of "carrying a weapon" as seen from a legal standpoint):  The Act's other subsections go on to describe the specific circumstances in which one may legally carry that weapon. Though the language in some of Act 746 had created confusion over the legalities of open and concealed carry without a permit with some state officials and law enforcement, it has since been amended to correct these confusions and goes on to describe the specific instances and places where it is legal to carry a weapon.  

Background on the confusion that surrounded Act 746:

While constitutional gun rights advocates and most law enforcement agencies have tried to argue that Act 746 legalizes open and concealed carry in Arkansas without a permit, Attorney General Dustin McDaniel at the time, issued a non-binding opinion on July 8, 2013 stating that Act 746 applies only to persons who are carrying firearms while "on a journey across or through Arkansas," that open carry remains illegal and that a valid permit is still required for concealed carry for those who are not traveling across Arkansas. In his opinion written to State Senator Eddie Joe Williams, Attorney General McDaniel defined a journey as "travel beyond one's county of residence," but further stated it would be ultimately up to the discretion of law enforcement officials and county prosecutors as to whether or not persons carrying without a valid permit would be arrested and prosecuted.

In August 2015, Attorney General Leslie Rutledge issued a non-binding opinion that open carry is legal while not affecting concealed carry, and that a concealed carry license is still required:

Attorney General Leslie Rutledge has also stated that open carry may generate reasonable suspicion for an officer to stop and briefly detain a person.

Despite these non-binding opinions, most local courts have thrown out or dropped the charges on carrying a weapon. One case was ruled guilty in a lower court in Bald Knob. The defendant appealed and the court dismissed the case potentially setting a precedent that open carry is legal. Regardless of what some state or law enforcement officials' views are on Act 746, most agencies and citizens agree with sponsors of the Act, that Arkansas is a constitutional carry state.

References

Arkansas law
Arkansas